The New York City Department for the Aging (DFTA) is the department of the government of New York City that provides support and information for older people (those over 60). Its regulations are compiled in title 69 of the New York City Rules. Lorraine Cortés-Vázquez has been the commissioner of DFTA since April 9, 2019.

History
The passage of the federal Older Americans Act in 1965 created a nationwide aging network consisting of the federal Administration on Aging, along with state offices and local area agencies. In 1968, New York City established the Mayor's Office for the Aging, which was funded as a three-year demonstration project by the Older Americans Act. The office was responsible for planning, coordinating, and funding services for the elderly such as nutrition and hot meal programs in underserved and unserved communities, and initiating home-delivered meals.

In 1975, through an amendment of the New York City Charter, the Mayor's Office for Aging became the New York City Department for the Aging. Alice M. Brophy, who had headed the Mayor's Office for the Aging since its creation in 1968, became the first commissioner.

Commissioners
The following is a list of the commissioners since the department was created:

References

External links
 New York City Department for the Aging
 Department for the Aging in the Rules of the City of New York

Aging